The Pharmaceutical Inspection Convention and Pharmaceutical Inspection Co-operation Scheme (PIC/S) are two international instruments between countries and pharmaceutical inspection authorities. The PIC/S is meant as an instrument to improve co-operation in the field of Good Manufacturing Practices between regulatory authorities and the pharmaceutical industry.

History
The PIC (Pharmaceutical Inspection Convention) was founded in October 1970 by the European Free Trade Association (EFTA), under the title of the Convention for the Mutual Recognition of Inspections in Respect of the Manufacture of Pharmaceutical Products. The initial members comprised the 10 member countries of EFTA at that time. In the early 1990s it was realized that because of an incompatibility between the Convention and European law, it was not possible for new countries to be admitted as members of PIC. European law did not permit individual EU countries that were members of PIC to sign agreements with other countries seeking to join PIC. As a consequence the Pharmaceutical Inspection Co-operation Scheme was formed on 2 November 1995. The Pharmaceutical Inspection Co-operation Scheme is an informal agreement between health authorities instead of a formal treaty between countries. PIC and the PIC Scheme, which operate together in parallel, are jointly referred to as PIC/S. PIC/S became operational in November 1995.

Since its conception until 2003, PIC/S did not have a distinct legal identity. Its Secretariat was provided by the European Free Trade Association. Based on PIC/S meeting in June 2003, its committee decided to constitute itself as a Swiss Association in accordance with article 60 of the Swiss Civil Code which refer to other internationally active organizations established in Switzerland such as the International Committee of the Red Cross (ICRC). On 1 January 2004, PIC/S established its own Secretariat in Geneva, Switzerland.

Purpose
PIC/S has a number of provisions intended to establish the following:

 Mutual recognition of inspection between member countries, so that an inspection carried out by officials of one member country will be recognized as valid by other members.
 Equivalent principles of inspection methodology, so that it is understood that inspectors in each member country will be following the same best practices when carrying out inspections.
 Mechanisms for the training of inspectors.
 Harmonization of written standards of Good Manufacturing Practices.
 Lines of communication between member country inspectors/inspectorates.

Members 

The following are the state members of PIC/S as of October 2021:

See also 
 GxP
 Good automated manufacturing practice (GAMP)
 Corrective and preventive action (CAPA)
 Validation (drug manufacture)
 European Medicines Agency (EMEA)
 European Federation of Pharmaceutical Industries and Associations (EFPIA)
 Pharmaceutical Research and Manufacturers of America (PhRMA)

References

External links 
 
 European Federation of Pharmaceutical Industries and Associations (EFPIA)
 Japan Pharmaceutical Manufacturers Association (JPMA)
 Pharmaceutical Research and Manufacturers of America (PhRMA)

Pharmaceutical industry
Pharmaceuticals policy
Intergovernmental organizations established by treaty
International organisations based in Switzerland